Something About You is Joey Yung's fourth Cantonese full length studio album, released on 15 May 2002.

Background
This was Joey Yung's first album since she temporarily "lost her voice" in late 2001 and her 3-month break from the HK music industry. The break was spent recovering, improving her dancing skills in the United States and getting a plastic surgery to upgrade her appearance in Japan. Through the help of an excellent singing teacher, she regained her voice through acupuncture in Nanjing (though her voice is not as stable as it used to be). Being the first album after not being in the spotlight for a while, this was a highly anticipated album, selling over 50,000 copies in Hong Kong (Platinum status). This album is a fan favourite because almost all songs were considered "plug/single worthy", as 9 out of 10 songs has been performed live before and/or were promoted.

Release and Promotion
一面之緣, 抱抱, Mad About You, and 啜泣 were plugged/promoted and performed at various functions and concerts. Meanwhile 我的麻煩男友 was given an MV even though it was not promoted; 小天使 was performed a couple times live (like in the Feel the Pop Mini Concert) as was 四面台 (like in Show Up Live). Though 舊日回憶的山丘 and 早有預謀 were performed only once live (in the 903 id Club Music is Live concert), this shows that they were still songs of great quality.

Vocal Consciousness and album reputation
Joey said that when she finished recording the album, she was paranoid that her voice on the album was not good enough (because of her vocal cord issue previously), but one of her vocal coaches and mentors Roman Tam comforted her and told her that her voice on the album sounded great.

Track listing
一面之緣 Nodding Acquaintance (Nissin Instant Noodle TVC Theme Song)
抱抱 Hug (~H2O+ TVC Theme Song)
Mad About You
啜泣 Weeping
拍拖 Dating
四面台 Arena Stage
舊日回憶的山丘 The Hills of Memories
小天使 Little Angel
我的麻煩男友 My Troublesome Boyfriend
早有預謀 Premeditation
一面之緣 Nodding Acquaintance (Cute Version)

Joey Yung albums
2002 albums